This list of churches in Kalundborg Municipality lists church buildings in Kalundborg Municipality, Denmark. The municipality is situated on the northwestern part of the island of Zealand and also comprises the smaller islands of Sejerø and Nekselø.

Overview
Kalundborg Municipality belongs to the Diocese of Roskilde, a diocese within the Evangelical Lutheran Church of Denmark. It is divided into 34 parishes. The parish of Gierslev contains two churches, Gierslev Church and Vester Løve Church. Ubberup Church belongs to a so-called valgmenighed.

The municipality's largest and most notable church is the five-towered Church of Our Lady which stands on a hill above the historical centre of Kalundborg. Apart from that, the area is characterized by its many white-washed parish churches from the 13th century. The churches in Gørlev, Rørby, Sæby, Tømmerup, Viskinge and Ørslev all feature medieval church frescos.

List

See also
 List of churches in Odsherred Municipality
 List of churches in Næstved Municipality

References

External links

 Nordens kirker: Nordvestsjælland

 
Kalundborg